The Jermy Baronetcy was a title in the Baronetage of England.  It was created in November 1663 for Robert Jermy.  However, nothing further is known of the title.

1663
Sir Robert Jermy, 1st Baronet (died after 1663)

References

Extinct baronetcies in the Baronetage of England
1663 establishments in England